The 1950 season was the 20th completed season of Finnish Football League Championship, known as the Mestaruussarja.

Overview
The Mestaruussarja was administered by the Finnish Football Association and the competition's 1950 season was contested by 10 teams. IKissat Tampere won the championship and the two lowest placed teams of the competition, TuWe Turku and Kullervo Helsinki, were relegated to the Suomensarja.

League standings

Results

Footnotes

References
Finland - List of final tables (RSSSF)

Mestaruussarja seasons
Fin
Fin
1